John Friedman Alice Kimm Architects (JFAK) is an American architecture firm founded in 1996 in Los Angeles, California USA.

History
JFAK's architectural practice was founded by husband-and-wife team, John Friedman and Alice Kimm. Friedman has a B.S. in Architecture from the Massachusetts Institute of Technology (MIT) and a Master of Architecture from Harvard University. Kimm has a Bachelor of Arts in Economics from Cornell University and a Master of Architecture from Harvard University.

JFAK's work has been widely recognized. They received a Responsible Disruptors Award from Metropolis Magazine in 2022 for their Open Source Homelessness Initiative (OSHI). In 2004, Friedman and Kimm were named Architectural League Emerging Voices by the Architectural League of New York. Their work has been noted in The Los Angeles Times, The Architect's Newspaper, LAist, Curbed LA, and Arch Daily.

Notable projects
In 2021, JFAK opened the Navig8 Council District 8 Homeless Navigation Center, which has proven indispensable to the local community. That same year, they contributed a public art project, Listen In, to the United Way of Greater LA. In 2016, JFAK completed a 144,000 square-foot collegiate recreation facility, the Roberts Pavilion, at Claremont McKenna College,  as well as the La Kretz Innovation Campus (LKIC), a 3.2-acre campus located in a former furniture and fabric warehouse in the Los Angeles’ Arts District for entrepreneurs, engineers, and policymakers to innovate and support LA’s green economy. The building of the LA Cleantech Incubator (LACI) is an adaptive reuse of a 61,000 square-foot warehouse that includes Los Angeles Department of Water and Power (LADWP) facilities, offices, conference rooms, labs, prototyping workshops, and an event space. The project has been published in Metropolis Magazine, Wallpaper, and Dezeen.

Awards and recognition

2022 
Responsible Disruptors Award, Metropolis Magazine

2017 
 Award: Athletic Business Journal Facility of Merit, Roberts Pavilion
 Award: Rudy Bruner Silver Medal for Urban Excellence, La Kretz Innovation Campus
 Award: AIA|LA Residential Honor Award, Multi-Family Residential Category, Peace Creek Villas
 Award: Interior Design, Best of Year Award, Roberts Pavilion

2015 
 Idea, Form, Resonance: 30 Years of Emerging Voices (Princeton Architectural Press)

2014 
 Interior Design (online), March, Ehrlich Retreat +

2013 
 Award: AIA Los Angeles, Merit Award, Ehrlich Retreat +

References

External links 

American companies established in 1996
Architecture firms based in California
1996 establishments in California
Companies based in Los Angeles